The Ministry of Legal Affairs of Saint Vincent and the Grenadines oversees the legal system in the government of Saint Vincent and the Grenadines. There were  instances in the past in which the Minister of Legal Affairs simultaneously served as the Attorney General or Minister of Information and Justice. Other titles have included Minister of Justice and Minister of Grenadine Affairs and Legal Affairs.

List of ministers (Post-1979 upon achieving independence) 

 Arthur Williams (1979-1980)
 Grafton Cephas Isaacs (1980-1983)
 Leonard Riviere (1984)
 Emery Robertson (1985-1986)
 Parnel Campbell (1987-1995)
 Carlyle Dougan (1996)
 Carl Joseph (1996-2001) 
 Ralph Gonsalves (2002–present)

See also 

 Justice ministry
 Politics of Saint Vincent and the Grenadines

References 

Justice ministries
Government of Saint Vincent and the Grenadines